Season 2: All-Time Classic American Love Songs was compiled of classic American love songs performed by the top eleven finalists from season 2 of American Idol and contains two ensemble tracks. It was released in 2003.

The album debuted at No.2 on the Nielsen Soundscan U.S. album chart for the week ending May 4, 2003 with sales of 101,225 the first week.  It was certified gold on May 30, 2003, and its total sales reached 648,000.

Track listing
 "What the World Needs Now is Love" (Burt Bacharach) –  American Idol Season 2 Finalists 
 "Superstar" (The Carpenters) – Ruben Studdard 
 "On the Wings of Love" (Jeffrey Osborne) – Clay Aiken
 "At Last" (Etta James) – Julia DeMato 
 "Three Times a Lady" (Commodores) –  Josh Gracin 
 "Let's Stay Together" (Al Green) – Trenyce 
 "Back At One" (Brian McKnight) – Rickey Smith 
 "Killing Me Softly" (Roberta Flack) – Kimberly Caldwell 
 "Open Arms" (Journey) – Corey Clark
 "How Do I Live" (LeAnn Rimes) – Carmen Rasmusen
 "Over the Rainbow" (Judy Garland) – Kimberley Locke
 "Overjoyed" (Stevie Wonder) – Charles Grigsby
 "God Bless the USA" (Lee Greenwood) – American Idol Season 2 Finalists

Charts

Weekly charts

Year-end charts

References

American Idol compilation series
2003 soundtrack albums
2003 compilation albums